Kurt Borcherding (born February 25, 1967) is a retired American rower. He is one of University of Wisconsin former rowers who are smokejumpers.  He is an Alaska Smokejumper.

References

External links 
 

1967 births
Living people
American male rowers
World Rowing Championships medalists for the United States
Pan American Games medalists in rowing
Pan American Games gold medalists for the United States
Rowers at the 1999 Pan American Games
Medalists at the 1999 Pan American Games